North from Thursday is a 1960 novel from Australian author Jon Cleary. It is set in New Guinea and concerns the eruption of a volcano, forcing a group of survivors to flee across the country. The story is based on the 1951 eruption of Mount Lamington.

Cleary was motivated to write the novel because he was interested in exploring the concept of Australia as a colonial power and researched the book by visiting New Guinea with his wife.  He went on a patrol in the Highlands.

Reception
The novel was not a big seller in Australia but did well in other countries. It was optioned for the movies but a film version proved too expensive to raise finance.

Adaptation
The novel was serialised in the Sydney Morning Herald and was adapted for radio in 1963.

References

External links
North from Thursday at AustLit (subscription required)

1960 Australian novels
Fiction set in 1951
Novels set in New Guinea
William Collins, Sons books
Novels by Jon Cleary